Mount Elgon Constituency or Mt. Elgon Constituency is an electoral constituency in Bungoma County, Kenya. It was formerly the only constituency in the now defunct Mount Elgon District. The constituency was established for the 1963 elections.

Members of Parliament 
Since independence, Mt. Elgon constituency electorates has elected five different Members of the National Assembly (MPs). Daniel Moss was the pioneer MP in 1963, while Fred Chesebe Kapondi is the incumbent. It is worthy also noting that Mt. Elgon is the only constituency created at independence that has never been subdivided to create more electoral area units, an issue that has disenfranchised its electorate. This was witnessed by the recent call for ELEXIT (Elgon Exit from Bungoma County), a memorandum that was received at the SENATE during the highs of BBI.

Wards 

The constituency has six wards, all electing Members of County Assembly (MCAs) for the Bungoma County Assembly.

References 

Constituencies of Western Province (Kenya)
Constituencies in Bungoma County
1963 establishments in Kenya
Constituencies established in 1963